Neottia cordata, the lesser twayblade or heartleaf twayblade, is an orchid of upland bogs and mires that rarely exceeds  in height. It was formerly placed in the genus Listera, but molecular phylogenetic studies have shown that Neottia nidus-avis, the bird's-nest orchid, evolved within the same group.

It is never very common but may be frequently overlooked because of its small size and a tendency to grow underneath heather on sphagnum moss. The single erect flower-stem is often tinged red and is clasped near the base by a pair or ovate-orbicular glossy green leaves. The small flowers which look deceptively simple in structure for an orchid, are purple-green in colour with a somewhat swollen calyx.

Distribution
It has a circumpolar distribution being found in Europe, Asia and large parts of North America. In the United Kingdom its distribution is largely western and northern, becoming most common in the western Highlands of Scotland, Snowdonia in Wales, and the Lake District in England. (Codes)

Ecology 
The flowers produce nectar and are pollinated principally by fungus gnats in the groups Mycetophilidae and Sciaridae.

Mycorrhizal partners are almost exclusively fungi in the Sebacinales clade Serendipitaceae. There may also be some association with Ceratobasidiaceae and/or Tulasnellaceae.

See also
Listera ovata

References

External links
 
 
 

Orchids of North America
Orchids of Europe
Plants described in 1753
Taxa named by Carl Linnaeus
Orchids of Asia
cordata
Orchids of the United States